Gulnar Eleanor "Guli" Francis-Dehqani (born 18 June 1966) is an Iranian-born British Anglican bishop who has been Bishop of Chelmsford since 2021. She previously served as the first Bishop of Loughborough, the sole suffragan bishop in the Diocese of Leicester from 2017 to 2021.

Early life and education
Guli Dehqani-Tafti was born in Isfahan, Iran in 1966. Her father Hassan Dehqani-Tafti (1920–2008) was the Anglican Bishop in Iran from 1961 until his retirement in 1990, serving also as President Bishop of the Episcopal Church in Jerusalem and the Middle East, 1976–1986. Her mother Margaret was a daughter of William Thompson (Bishop in Iran, 1935–1960). In October 1979, after the Iranian Revolution, her parents were attacked in an assassination attempt which left her mother wounded, and her 24-year-old brother, Bahram, was murdered by Iranian government agents in May 1980. When she was 14, her family was forced to leave the country in the wake of the Iranian Revolution; the family settled in Hampshire, where Hassan remained Bishop in exile.

She was educated at Clarendon School for Girls, a private boarding school in Worcestershire, England. She went on to study music at the University of Nottingham, graduating with a Bachelor of Arts (BA) degree in 1989. She studied theology at the University of Bristol, graduating with a Master of Arts (MA) degree in 1994 and a Doctor of Philosophy (PhD) in 1999. Her doctoral thesis was titled "Religious feminism in an age of empire: CMS women missionaries in Iran, 18691934". From 1995 to 1998, she trained for ordination at the South East Institute of Theological Education.

Ordained ministry
Francis-Dehqani was ordained in the Church of England as a deacon at Michaelmas (27 September) 1998  by Tom Butler, Bishop of Southwark, at Southwark Cathedral. She was ordained a priest the following Michaelmas (2 October 1999) by Wilfred Wood, Bishop of Croydon, at All Saints', Kingston-upon-Thames. From 1998 to 2002, she served her curacy at St Mary the Virgin, Mortlake with East Sheen in the Diocese of Southwark. Then, from 2002 to 2004, she was a chaplain to the Royal Academy of Music and to St Marylebone C of E School. In 2004, she stepped down from full-time ministry to raise her children. From 2004 to 2011, she held Permission to Officiate in the Diocese of Peterborough. She also worked at the University of Northampton Multi-Faith Chaplaincy between 2009 and 2010 "helping the chaplaincy team develop a more effective multi-faith approach".

In 2011, Francis-Dehqani returned to full-time ministry, having been appointed Curate Training Officer for the Diocese of Peterborough. She was additionally appointed the diocese's Adviser for Women's Ministry in 2012. 2013–2017, she was a Member of the General Synod (she was later an elected suffragan member, 2019–2021, and ex officio as a diocesan, since 2021). She was made an honorary canon of Peterborough Cathedral in November 2016.

Episcopal ministry
On 11 July 2017, it was announced that Francis-Dehqani would become the first Bishop of Loughborough, the suffragan bishop of the Diocese of Leicester. In addition to her suffragan duties, she also had "a focus on supporting Black, Asian and Minority Ethnic (BAME) clergy, lay workers and congregations" within the diocese. She was consecrated a bishop during a service at Canterbury Cathedral on 30 November 2017. This made her the first BAME woman to be made a bishop in the Church of England.

It was announced on 17 December 2020 that Francis-Dehqani was to translate to Chelmsford in 2021, becoming the diocesan bishop of the Diocese of Chelmsford (East London and Essex). Her canonical election by the College of Canons of Chelmsford Cathedral took place by teleconference on 26 January 2021; the confirmation of her election, by which she legally took her new See, was on 11 March 2021.

She joined the House of Lords as one of the Lords Spiritual, under the Lords Spiritual (Women) Act 2015 on 1 November 2021.

Personal life
She is married to Lee Francis-Dehqani, a fellow Anglican priest and canon: at the time of her appointment as bishop he was serving as Team Rector of Oakham and Rural Dean of Rutland and in 2018 was appointed Team Rector of the Fosse Team in Leicester Diocese. Together they have three children.

References

1966 births
Living people
20th-century Anglican clergy
21st-century Church of England bishops
Bishops of Loughborough
Bishops of Chelmsford
Women Anglican bishops
Lords Spiritual
Iranian Anglicans
Exiles of the Iranian Revolution in the United Kingdom
Iranian emigrants to the United Kingdom
People from Isfahan
People educated at Clarendon School for Girls
Alumni of the University of Nottingham
Alumni of the University of Bristol
Iranian people of English descent